Hwang Hyun-soo (born 22 July 1995) is a South Korean footballer who plays as a defender for FC Seoul.

Club career 
Hwang joined FC Seoul in 2014. He made his K League 1 debut against Jeonbuk Hyundai Motors. 

He scored his first goal for the club on 2 August 2017 against Gangwon FC in a 3-1 victory at the Seoul World Cup Stadium.

International career 
Hwang represented South Korea U-23 at the 2018 Asian Games where he helped South Korea to win a gold medal, receiving military privileges as a result along with the rest of the team.

Club career statistics

References

External links
 
 Hwang Hyun-soo – National Team stats at KFA 

1995 births
Living people
Association football defenders
South Korean footballers
FC Seoul players
K League 1 players
Footballers at the 2018 Asian Games
Asian Games medalists in football
Asian Games gold medalists for South Korea
Medalists at the 2018 Asian Games
South Korea under-20 international footballers
South Korea under-23 international footballers